Tuomas Planman was the keyboardist for the Finnish Melodic death metal band Norther, until their break up in 2012; he also played in the black metal band Gramary.

Personal information
Date of Birth: 17 March 1980
From: Espoo, Finland
Instrument: Keyboards
Influences: Cradle of Filth, Pantera, and Yngwie Malmsteen to name a few.
Started Playing: 1988

Equipment
Korg Triton Studio Pro 76-Key Workstation.
Korg M3 73-Key Workstation

External links
Official Norther website
EndlessWar, an extensive Norther fansite
 NORTHER - the Finnish Breeze fansite -
Official Gramary website

Credits
All of the information in this article was found at the Official Norther website and the EndlessWar member information page. Photo found at the Spinefarm press area.

1980 births
Living people
Finnish keyboardists
Heavy metal keyboardists
People from Espoo
Norther members